The 1985 election for Mayor of Los Angeles took place on April 9, 1985. Incumbent Tom Bradley was re-elected over councilmember John Ferraro. Bradley's re-election would give him a fourth term, an unprecedented feat in the office as no mayor except for James R. Toberman (from 1878 to 1882) had been re-elected to a fourth consecutive term.

Election 
Bradley had previously run for Governor of California in 1982, a year after his re-election in 1981, but lost to George Deukmejian. Bradley had bee speculated to try for Governor again in 1986, but in January 1985, Bradley announced his run for an unprecedented fourth term. He was mainly challenged by councilman Ferraro, who was viewed as a more moderate option to Bradley. Bradley was widely expected to win re-election, with polls showing Bradley ahead of Ferraro. Polls also showed that Bradley was mostly supported by non-white Democrats while Ferraro was supported by white Republicans, even though both were Democrats. Bradley won outright and was election to a fourth term in office, the first time in Los Angeles history that someone was election to a fourth full term.

Results

References and footnotes

External links
 Office of the City Clerk, City of Los Angeles

1985
Los Angeles 
Los Angeles mayoral election
Mayoral election
Los Angeles mayoral election